Schefflera urbaniana is a species of plant in the family Araliaceae. It is endemic to Martinique.

References

Flora of Martinique
urbaniana
Vulnerable plants
Taxonomy articles created by Polbot
Taxobox binomials not recognized by IUCN